The Dominion Bureau of Statistics was a Canadian government organization responsible for conducting censuses.
It was formed in 1918 by the Statistics Act, but was replaced by Statistics Canada in 1971.

References

Former Canadian federal departments and agencies
National statistical services